Gajjumata Metrobus Terminal Station is a Lahore Metrobus station in Gajju Matta, Punjab, Pakistan, located on Ferozepur Road, just north of Rohi Nala Road. It serves as the southern terminus of the Lahore Metrobus. The terminal consists of a series of covered platforms and a fenced off busway.

West Platform: Passenger loading for northbound buses
East Platform: Passenger unloading/layover for southbound buses

See also
 Shahdara Metrobus Terminal Station
 Lahore Metrobus

References

Bus stations in Lahore
Transport in Lahore
Lahore Metro stations